Archips argyrospila, the fruit-tree leafroller moth,  is a moth of the family Tortricidae. It is found in most of the United States and southern Canada.

The length of the forewings is 6-10.2 mm for males and 8.5-11.7 mm for females. Adults have a variable forewing colour consisting of combination of reddish brown, dark brown and tan. Adults are on wing from mid May to July in one generation per year.

The larvae feed on a wide range of plants and are considered a pest on apples and pears. Recorded host plants include: Medicago, Malus, Prunus, Taxodium distichum, Phaseolus, Vaccinium, Betula, Acer negundo, Aesculus, Ceanothus, Cercocarpus, Citrus, Quercus, Eriodictyon, Vitis, Crataegus, Carya, Gleditsia triacanthos, Humulus, Syringa, Avena, Allium, Maclura pomifera, Pyrus, Rheum, Sassafras and Juglans species. First instar larvae bore into the buds of their host plant. Later instars roll or tie leaves together or tie them to fruit. They feed on the leaves, flowers, buds or fruits of the host plant. Pupation takes place within the larval shelter.

References 

Archips
Moths described in 1863
Moths of North America